William Mitchell (January 19, 1807 – September 11, 1865) was an American lawyer and politician who served one term as a United States representative from Indiana from 1861 to 1863.

Early life and career 
He was born in Root, New York where he attended the public schools. Later, he studied law and was admitted to the bar in 1836. He moved to Kendallville, Indiana, and was one of its founding fathers.

He had a role in the founding of the Grand Rapids and Indiana Railroad. It provided a means of opening up northern Michigan for development of towns and cities.

Mitchell practiced law in Kendallville and served as the first postmaster for the town from 1836 to 1846.

Political career 
He was a member of the Indiana House of Representatives in 1841 and a justice of the peace.

Congress 
He was elected as a Republican to the Thirty-seventh Congress (March 4, 1861 – March 3, 1863) but was an unsuccessful candidate for reelection in 1862 to the Thirty-eighth Congress.

Later career and death 
After leaving Congress, he engaged in the cotton business. He died in Macon, Georgia in 1865 and was buried in Lake View Cemetery, Kendallville, Indiana.

New York State Senator Thomas B. Mitchell (died 1876) was his brother. He also had another brother George A. Mitchell.

References

Sources 

1807 births
1865 deaths
People from Montgomery County, New York
Republican Party members of the Indiana House of Representatives
People from Kendallville, Indiana
19th-century American politicians
Republican Party members of the United States House of Representatives from Indiana